FEG or Feg may refer to:

Organisations
 Federación Española de Guidismo, the Spanish Federation of the Guide Movement
 Fegyver- és Gépgyár (FÉG), a Hungarian arms manufacturer
 FÉG 37M Pistol
 FEG AP9
 FEG PA-63, semi-automatic pistol
 Fighting and Entertainment Group, a Japanese combat sport promoter
 Force Element Group, Australian Defence Force
 Foundation for Effective Governance, former Ukrainian organization
 Friedrich-Ebert-Gymnasium, a school in Hamburg, Germany

Transportation
 Fellgate Metro station, South Tyneside, Tyne and Wear Metro station code
 Fergana International Airport, Uzbekistan, IATA code
 FlyEgypt, ICAO code for the Egyptian airline

Other uses
 Phenylalanine-glutamine-glycine (FEG), an anti-inflammatory peptide, and feG, its D-isomeric form
 Field emission gun, a type of electron gun
 Ferroelectric generator